Ski jumping competitions took place on 20–27 January 2013 in Liberec, Czech Republic, as the part of the 2013 FIS Nordic Junior World Ski Championships. This competition falls under the governing body of the International Ski Federation.

All three competitions – two individual (men and women) and one team (men) – took place on the normal hill, Ještěd. The women's competition took place for the eighth time, while men competed for the 33rd time.

The title team champion defended Norway (men) and Japan (women). The individual gold medalist, Nejc Dežman from Slovenia, couldn't participate in the Championship as he became a senior. The silver medalist took part in the Championships – Jaka Hvala and Aleksander Zniszczoł. Individuals of the individual women event was defended by Sara Takanashi from Japan.

It was the second time that the Junior World Ski Jumping Championships took place in Czech Republic. In 1993 the Junior Championships were in Harrachov.

76 men from 22 countries and 51 women from 12 countries competed in the Championships. In all, there were 127 jumpers representing 23 nations.

Before the competition

Favorites 

Before the Championships, the favorites were Jaka Hvala (Slovenia), Andreas Wellinger (Germany), Karl Geiger (Germany), Stefan Kraft (Austria), and Aleksander Zniszczoł (Poland).

Among women, the favorites were Sarah Hendrickson (USA), Sara Takanashi (Japan), Coline Mattel (France) and Evelyn Insam (Italy).

In the team competition, the favorites were Slovenia and Poland (men) and again Slovenia, Japan and Germany (women).

The competitions 
On 24 January, the individual competitions (men and women) took place. In the women's competition, Sara Takanashi(Japan) won first place. The silver medal by Evelyn Insam, and the bronze one – Katja Požun. In the men's competition, the winner was Jaka Hvala, who had almost 20 points more that the second Klemens Murańka. In third place was Stefan Kraft.

On 26 January, the team competitions took place. In the women's competition the winner was Slovenia. The silver medal was France, and the bronze one - Germany. In the men competition the winner was Slovenia, too. The second place for Poland, and the third – Germany.

Ski jumping hills 
All four competitions took place on the normal hill (Ještěd, HS 100) in Liberec.

Jury 
The Chief of Competition was Horst Tielmann. The FIS Technical Delegate was Ryszard Guńka, and his assistant – Thomas Hasslberger.

The results

Men competition

Individual competition (24.01.2013)

Team competition (26.01.2013)

Women

Individual competition (24.01.2013)

Team competition (26.01.2013)

References

Ski jumping in the Czech Republic